Mariyam Nisha (born 19 May 1979) is a Maldivian former actress.

Early life
Nisha was born on 19 May 1979 in Dh. Rinbudhoo. She recalled her childhood days as a "disturbing chapter" of life where she had to refrain from enjoying with friends due to a skin problem. At the age of twelve, she got married and a year later, they were blessed with their first child.

Career

1994–99: Early releases and Haqqu
At the age of fourteen, Nisha made her screen debut with the video song "Gendhanyaa Gendhavaashey" alongside Malik Mohamed. Featured in a television programme titled Mahrabu the song was liked by the audience topping several charts during the time of its release.

Nisha played the role of Hana Shareef, a young girl who has been attracted by two siblings, in Hussain Adil's comedy drama film Dhehithehge Loabi (1995) alongside Abdul Rahman Rauf and Ahmed Sharmeel. The film tells a story of two brothers who fall in love with the same girl, which causes rivalry and misunderstandings between them. She next appeared in Mohamed Shiyaz's Dhushman which features Hussain Sobah, Aminath Rasheedha and Hamid Ali in pivotal roles. In the film, she plays the role Nisha, a rich girl who loses her boyfriend over social discrimination. The same year, she starred in the family drama Manzil which follows an intelligent and hardworking orphan, played by Aishath Shiranee, whose life turns a dramatic change while working as a servant in a reputed family.

In 1996, Yoosuf Rafeeu's award-winning film Haqqu was released which featured Nisha as Lamha, a promiscuous woman who falls in love with a married man. The film revolving around a man who is forced to marry a woman he dissents, stars Nisha, Reeko Moosa Manik and Mariyam Shakeela in lead roles. The film received positive reviews from critics and her performance fetched her a Gaumee Film Award for Best Actress.

In 1997, Nisha appeared alongside Hussain Sobah and Jamsheedha Ahmed as an established actress who sacrifices her career for an underprivileged talented vocalist in Amjad Ibrahim's Loabeege Aniyaa. The following year, she starred as a pampered child of a family trapped in a lie, in Hamid Ali's drama film Mila Handhuvaru (1998). She next starred as a hyper-active girl in Amjad Ibrahim's comedy drama film Qurbaani (1999) starring opposite Yoosuf Shafeeu and Hussain Sobah. The film was a financially successful project and was declared a Mega-Hit at the end of its run at cinema. She next starred opposite Hussain Sobah and Jamsheedha Ahmed in Fathimath Nahula's debut direction Fahuneyvaa (2000) which portrays the love-conflict of a man between a prominent stage performer and a deaf-mute poor girl. Nisha played the role of Fazeela, a deaf-mute girl and the wife who was abandoned for a rich famous girl. Her performance and the film was critically appreciated by critics and was a Hit commercially by screening twenty six housefull shows at cinema.

2000–05: Multiple releases and Zuleykha
In 2000, she played the role of Sofi, an unsympathetic young woman who mistreats her own mother and has an extra-marital affair with a womanizer in Abdul Faththaah's directorial debut, Himeyn Dhuniye which received positive reviews from critics. Besides, Nisha played the emotionally immature wife opposite Yoosuf Shafeeu in Amjad Ibrahim's comedy drama film, Majubooru Loabi (2000).

Nisha starred as Zeyna, an acquiescent wife in Fathimath Nahula's drama film Naaummeedhu (2000) which depicts the story of a happily married couple whose life is shattered into pieces when they unintentionally invite a seductive woman into their life. The film receiving favorable reviews from critics was able to screen twenty eight houseful shows at Olympus Cinema, making it the highest grossing Maldivian film of the year. It was followed by Ali Shameel's drama film Hithi Nimun (2001) featuring opposite Mohamed Shavin and Sheereen Abdul Wahid, which follows the storyline of a stubborn young man who abandons his girlfriend when he discovers about her pregnancy.

In 2002, Nisha featured alongside Yoosuf Shafeeu, Mariyam Nazima, Moosa Zakariyya and Ahmed Shimau in Shimau-directed family drama film Loabi Nuvevununama. Written by Fathimath Nahula, the story narrates the journey of a handicapped man who has been betrayed in love and unknowingly marries his brother's love interest. The film was a critical and commercial success. She next worked with Amjad Ibrahim for his horror film Sandhuravirey (2002) which narrates the story of a female jinn aiming to win the heart of a human being. Featuring Yoosuf Shafeeu and Nisha in lead roles, the film received poor reviews from critics. She played dual roles in the film; Yaasha, the jinn desperately trying to gain the love and trust of Dhiyash (played by Shafeeu) and Shafqa, the lookalike of Yaasha whom Dhiyas finally marries.

Nisha collaborated with Easa Shareef for a horror film Ginihila (2003) alongside Ali Seezan, Niuma Mohamed and Reeko Moosa Manik, playing the role of Sajuna, the forbearing wife who is pursued by a spirit and discovers her husband's extramarital affair with a psychopath girl. The film narrates the story of a young couple who decided to spend a romantic break to save their crumbling marriage and how events take a sinister turn when the wife experiences supernatural incidence which has her husband involvement in it. The film is an unofficial remake of Vikram Bhatt's Indian horror film Raaz (2002) featuring Bipasha Basu, Dino Morea, Malini Sharma and Ashutosh Rana which itself is an unofficial adaptation of What Lies Beneath.

Abdul Faththaah's horror film Eynaa was released in 2004, which appears Sheela Najeeb, Mohamed Manik, Ahmed Shah, Khadheeja Ibrahim Didi, Ibrahim Jihad and Nashidha Mohamed as six colleagues who go on a picnic to a haunted uninhabited island and their battle for survival. She played the pregnant wife of Nihan which was portrayed by Manik. The film garnered critical appreciation specially for its technical department and was a commercial success. Nisha reprised her role as Shafqa and Yaasha in Amjad Ibrahim's next directorial venture Sandhuravirey 2 (2004); a sequel to his 2002 horror film Sandhuravirey. Starring additional cast including Niuma Mohamed, Zeenath Abbas, Mohamed Shavin and Sheereen Abdul Wahid, the film follows a storyline of the daughter jinn avenging the death of its mother and sister on Dhiyash's family. Similar to its prequel, the film received negative response from critics.

Her only release of 2005 was another collaboration with Fathimath Nahula in the critically appreciated and commercially prosperous project, a romantic drama film Zuleykha (2005) which narrates the journey of a nine years old girl seeking the lost love of her mother. Featuring an ensemble cast including Sheela Najeeb, Yoosuf Shafeeu, Ali Seezan, Mohamed Manik and Mariyam Enash Sinan, Nisha played the titular role; a woman who volunteered to help a vulnerable father diagnosed with the last stage of cancer which fetched her a Gaumee Film Award nomination as the Best Actress. Thirty three housefull shows of the film were screened at the cinema making it the highest grossing Maldivian release of the year.

2008–11: 14 Vileyrey and career breaks
In 2009, Nisha collaborated with Amjad Ibrahim for his horror film Baaraige Fas, cast alongside Hussain Sobah, Amira Ismail, Ali Shameel, Mariyam Shakeela and Ahmed Azmeel. The film follows a temptress vampire who goes into a killing spree to quench her thirst. The film received mainly negative reviews from critics though her performance fetched her only Maldives Film Award nomination as the Best Actress.

In 2011 Nisha played the role of Shaira, an irresponsible sister who hides her husband's dirty secret, in the Moomin Fuad-directed crime tragedy drama Loodhifa. Featuring an ensemble cast, the film deals with current social issues in the society told from different perspectives of the characters. Made on a budget of MVR 600,000, the film was declared a commercial failure though it received wide critical acclaim. Her performance received positive response from critics though some noted her talent was "misused" with the small screen time. However, Ahmed Nadheem from Haveeru had a different opinion and wrote: "In the long three hour movie, Nisha was featured for merely three minutes but she outshone the rest of actress with her strong performance.  It was followed by a romantic horror film 14 Vileyrey, directed by Abdul Faththaah and starring Ali Seezan with Aishath Rishmy. Written by Ibrahim Waheed, the project faced controversy when the team of Kuhveriakee Kaakuhey? accuses Fatthah for "purloining the plot" of the latter. The film and her performance received mixed to positive reviews from critics; "Apart from her over-girly dialogue delivery at the beginning of the movie, she did a great job with the passing of the movie with countless expressions and acting skill". The film did good business at box office and was declared a "Hit".

Media image
In 2012, Nisha was ranked at the first position in the list of "Best Actresses in Maldives" compiled by Haveeru, where writer Ahmed Nadheem opined that Nisha is capable to "overshadow any actress with her presence".

Filmography

Feature film

Television

Short film

Other work

Accolades

References 

Living people
People from Malé
21st-century Maldivian actresses
Maldivian film actresses
1979 births